Leontine (French: Faut pas prendre les enfants du bon Dieu pour des canards sauvages) is a 1968 French comedy crime film directed by Michel Audiard and starring Françoise Rosay, Bernard Blier and Marlène Jobert.

It was shot at the Saint-Maurice Studios and on location around Paris and Menton on the French Riviera. The film's sets were designed by the art director Jean d'Eaubonne and Raymond Gabutti.

Synopsis
When the criminal Rita has robbed a bank with an accomplice who then refuses to share the gold bars they have taken, she calls in her aunt Leontine a respected ex-criminal now living in retirement in the South of France.

Cast
 Françoise Rosay as Leontine
 Bernard Blier as Charles
 Marlène Jobert as Rita
 André Pousse as Fred
 Robert Berri as Un conseiller de Charles
 Gérald Bruneau as Le Viking
 Michel Charrel as Un conseiller de Charles
 Mario David as Jacky	
 Sylvain Levignac as Un conseiller de Charles
 Roger Mailles as Un homme de main de Charles
 Raoul Saint-Yves as Raoul
 Jean Saudray as Un homme de main de Charles
 Dominique Zardi as Un tueur
 Paul Frankeur as Ruffin
 Robert Dalban as 	Casimir
 Claude Rollet as Tiburce

References

Bibliography 
 Oscherwitz, Dayna & Higgins, MaryEllen. The A to Z of French Cinema. Scarecrow Press, 2009.

External links 
 

1968 films
1968 comedy films
French crime comedy films
1960s French-language films
Films directed by Michel Audiard
Films with screenplays by Michel Audiard
Gaumont Film Company films
1960s French films